Downtown South Bend is the central business district of South Bend, Indiana. The boundaries downtown are generally considered to be the following: on the west bank of the St. Joseph River, north of Sample Street and east of Lafayette Boulevard. It features many local businesses as well as a hospital, hotels, museums, and office buildings.

Revitalization
In the 1970s, the area suffered from decreased economic activity and urban decay, but city-sponsored revitalization and reinvestment in the community has since improved downtown. Bike lanes and bus shelters have been introduced to allow for more attractive streets. Trees, small fountains, and monuments can be found here. Roundabouts and stop signs have replaced traffic lights at some intersections. Wider sidewalks featuring stone and brick have been put in place instead of concrete.

Entertainment venues and attractions
Morris Performing Arts Center is a historic 2,564-seat venue that hosts the South Bend Symphony Orchestra as well as musicals, plays, concerts, and other events. The Century Center is a 75,000+ sq ft convention center on the St. Joseph River. It contains the South Bend Museum of Art and connects via underground tunnel to the former College Football Hall of Fame.

Tallest Buildings

Historic landmarks
Historic places in the area include:
 Farmers Security Bank building
Morris Performing Arts Center
Robert A. Grant Federal Building and U.S. Courthouse
LaSalle Hotel
LaSalle Annex
Blackstone-State Theater
Tower Building
South Bend Soldiers and Sailors Monument
Citizens Bank Building
J.M.S. Building
I&M Building
Second St. Joseph County Courthouse
Third St. Joseph County Courthouse
Union Station

See also
Proposed new South Shore Line station in South Bend

References

South Bend
South Bend, Indiana